Caladenia fuscata, commonly known as dusky fingers, is a plant in the orchid family Orchidaceae and is endemic to eastern and south-eastern Australia, including Tasmania. It is a small ground orchid found in eucalyptus woodland and which flowers in September and October.

Description

The mid-lobe is small and pointed with small teeth on the edge and several rows of yellow-tipped calli in the centre. The lateral lobes are prominent, broad and protrude past the mid-lobe. Flowering occurs in September and October and is followed by a non-fleshy, dehiscent capsule containing a large number of seeds. It is similar to Caladenia carnea but is distinguished from it by its single flower, earlier flowering period and red stripes on the labellum and column.

Taxonomy and naming
Caladenia fuscata was first formally described as Caladenia carnea var. fuscata by Heinrich Gustav Reichenbach in 1871. It was raised to species status in 1989 by David Jones and Mark Clements. The specific epithet (fuscata) is derived from the Latin word fusca meaning "brown" in reference to the brownish coloration on the back of the sepals and petals.

Distribution and habitat
Dusky fingers occurs in Queensland, New South Wales, Victoria, Tasmania and South Australia where it grows in open forest, woodland and coastal scrub in a range of soil types. It is mostly only found on the drier western side of the Great Dividing Range. It has also been recorded in New Zealand.

References

fuscata
Plants described in 1871
Endemic orchids of Australia
Orchids of New South Wales
Orchids of Queensland
Orchids of South Australia
Orchids of Tasmania
Orchids of Victoria (Australia)